This is a list of the winners of the Bavarian Film Awards Prize Honorary award.

1985 Douglas Sirk
1986 Heinz Rühmann
1987 Luggi Waldleitner
1988 Bernhard Wicki
1989 Franz Seitz Jr.
1990 Fritz Preßmar
1991 Ruth Leuwerik
1992 Martin Benrath
1993 Vicco von Bülow
1994 Erich Kästner
1995 Kurt Hoffmann
1996 Marianne Hoppe
1997 Klaus Doldinger
1998 
1999 Liselotte Pulver
2000 Mario Adorf
2001 Hardy Krüger
2002 Roman Polanski
2003 Sir Peter Ustinov
2004 Volker Schlöndorff
2005 Maximilian Schell
2006 Michael Verhoeven
2007 Michael Ballhaus
2008 Peter Schamoni
2009 Joseph Vilsmaier
2010 Hannelore Elsner
2011 Wim Wenders
2012 Margarethe von Trotta
2013 Armin Mueller-Stahl
2014 Gernot Roll
2015 
2016 Bruno Ganz
2017 Werner Herzog
2018 Roland Emmerich
2019 Heiner Lauterbach

References
https://www.stmd.bayern.de/wp-content/uploads/2020/08/Bayerische-Filmpreisträger-bis-2020.pdf

Bavarian film awards